Gijsbrecht van Aemstel is a 17th-century history play by Joost van den Vondel, written to inaugurate Amsterdam's first city theatre.  The first production was planned to take place on 26 December 1637, but was postponed until 3 January 1638.  The piece was then performed annually (on New Year's Day) in Amsterdam until 1968.

Plot
Set in 1304, it tells the story of the siege of Amsterdam and its surrounding towns, united by the Kennemers and Waterlanders. The reason for the siege is Gijsbrecht's alleged involvement in the abduction and manslaughter of Floris V in 1296.

The enemy soldiers appear to leave but smuggle themselves into the town, hidden in a cargo of firewood being shipped in by the citizens of Amsterdam. After a violent battle, Gijsbrecht is forced to flee to Prussia, to found a "New Holland" there.

Historical accuracy
In reality, the nobleman who in 1304 invaded Amsterdam (to recover his position and possessions lost in 1296) was not Gijsbrecht IV (1235–1303), but his son  (1270–1345).

Historian Pim de Boer at the University of Groningen has found serious (though not entirely conclusive) indications that Gijsbrecht - after his exile, with a few followers - founded Pruissisch Holland (now in Poland), not far from Elbing (also now in Poland).

Parodies
Various parodies and continuations of the play have been produced by other authors, including the musical The Angel of Amsterdam (De Engel van Amsterdam).

Texts
http://www.dbnl.org/tekst/vond001gysb01/
http://cf.hum.uva.nl/dsp/ljc/vondel/gysbregt/gysbregt.html

Notes

References

External links

Dutch plays
Plays set in the 14th century
Plays set in the Netherlands
Plays based on real people
Plays based on actual events
Cultural depictions of Dutch men
Cultural depictions of lords
Cultural depictions of military officers
1630s plays